Profile is a Canadian biographical television series which aired on CBC Television from 1955 to 1957.

Premise
The series featured biographical documentaries on such Canadian and international personalities as Thérèse Casgrain, Moses Coady, Robert Frost, Billy Graham, A. Y. Jackson, Paul-Émile Léger, Arthur Lismer, Seán O'Casey, Bertrand Russell, Vilhjalmur Stefansson, Edward Steichen, Paul Tillich and Arnold Toynbee. The intent was for the interviews to be conducted at the subjects homes, although existing film biographies were used on occasion.

Scheduling
This half-hour series was broadcast for three seasons as follows (times in Eastern):

References

External links
 

CBC Television original programming
1965 Canadian television series debuts
1965 Canadian television series endings